The 1876 Pembrokeshire by-election was fought on 26 June 1876.  The byelection was fought due to the death of the incumbent Conservative MP, John Scourfield.  It was won by the Conservative candidate James Bevan Bowen.

References

1876 elections in the United Kingdom
1876 in Wales
1870s elections in Wales
19th century in Pembrokeshire
By-elections to the Parliament of the United Kingdom in Welsh constituencies
Elections in Pembrokeshire